Treasure Island is a 1971 Soviet adventure film directed by Yevgeni Fridman.

Plot 
The elderly pirate Billy Bones settles in a tavern. Jim Hawkins finds in his chest a map of Treasure Island, collects a team and sets off on a journey.

Cast 
 Boris Andreyev as Long John Silver
 Aare Laanemets as Jim Hawkins (voiced by Alexey Borzunov)
 Laimonas Noreika as Dr. David Livesey (voiced by Eduard Izotov)
 Algimantas Masiulis as Squire John Trelawney (voiced by Viktor Rozhdestvensky)
 Juozas Urmanavicius as Captain Alexander Smollett (voiced by Vladimir Druzhnikov)
 Igor Klass as Ben Gunn (voiced by Sergei Kurilov)
 Kazimieras Vitkus as Billy Bones (voiced by Anatoly Solovyov)
 Vladimir Grammatikov as Richard Joyce
 Antanas Pikelis as Israel Hands (voiced by Ivan Ryzhov)
 Vytautas Tomkus as George Merry (voiced by Leonid Markov)
 Andrei Fajt as Blind Pew (voiced by Mikhail Gluzsky)
 Lyudmila Shagalova as Mrs. Hawkins

References

External links 
 

1971 films
1970s Russian-language films
Soviet adventure films
1970s adventure films